Gertrude Orr (1891–1971) was an American screenwriter who worked primarily at Fox in the 1920s and 1930s. Her best-known films include Call of the Yukon and The Blind Goddess.

Biography 
Orr was born in Covington, Kentucky, the youngest of four children born to John Orr and Luella Roberts. The family relocated to Denver, Colorado, when she was young.

Orr began her career writing for The Denver Post in Denver, Colorado; her first assignment was writing obituaries. After moving to Hollywood and starting at Fox in the publicity department, she soon worked her way into the writing department; in 1925, she was the only woman on that team.

Orr also wrote a biography of famed circus tiger trainer Mabel Stark called Hold That Tiger in 1938.

Her marriage to Harold Martin ended in divorce.

Partial filmography 

 Slander House (1938)
 Call of the Yukon (1938)
 The Mandarin Mystery (1936)
 Country Gentleman (1936)
 The Harvester (1936)
 Without Children (1935)
 Little Men (1935)
 The Mad Parade (1931)
 A Woman Against the World (1928)
 The Loves of Carmen (1927)
 Married Alive (1927)
 Singed (1927)
 Marriage (1927)
 Bertha, the Sewing Machine Girl (1926)
 The Blind Goddess (1926)
 Smilin' at Trouble (1925)

References

1891 births
1971 deaths
American women screenwriters
20th-century American women writers
20th-century American screenwriters